is a railway station on the Minobu Line of Central Japan Railway Company (JR Central) located in the town of Nanbu, Minamikoma District, Yamanashi Prefecture, Japan.

Lines
Yorihata Station is served by the Minobu Line and is located 31.9 kilometers from the southern terminus of the line at Fuji Station.

Layout
Yorihata Station has one side platform serving a single bidirectional track. The station building is unattended and has neither automated ticket machines nor automated turnstiles.

Adjacent stations

History
Yorihata Station was opened on November 1, 1931 as a station on the original Fuji-Minobu Line. The line came under control of the Japanese Government Railways on May 1, 1941. The JGR became the JNR (Japan National Railway) after World War II. Along with the division and privatization of JNR on April 1, 1987, the station came under the control and operation of the Central Japan Railway Company.

Surrounding area
 Fuji River

See also
 List of railway stations in Japan

External links

  Minobu Line station information 

Railway stations in Japan opened in 1931
Railway stations in Yamanashi Prefecture
Minobu Line
Nanbu, Yamanashi